Leo Franklin Twiggs (born 1934 in St. Stephen, South Carolina) is an American painter and educator.

He developed the Fine Art Department at South Carolina State University, where he taught from 1973 until 1998.  Twiggs received his Bachelor of Arts degree from Claflin University in 1956 and his Master of Arts degree from New York University in 1964.  In 1970, Twiggs became the first African American student to receive a Doctorate of Arts (Ed.D) from the University of Georgia.  He has presented over fifty one-man shows during his career.

Twiggs received his BA summa cum laude from Claflin University, later studied at the Art Institute of Chicago and received his MA from New York University, where he studied with Hale Woodruff, the acclaimed African American painter and muralist. He received his doctorate in art education from the University of Georgia. As professor of art at South Carolina State University, he developed the Art Department and I.P. Stanback Museum. Twiggs was named professor emeritus in 2000.  He was the first visual artist to receive the Verner Award (Governor’s Trophy) for outstanding contributions to the arts in South Carolina.

Artwork 
Twiggs' paintings utilize a variation of the batik process which he began experimenting with in 1964.  This process of painting allows him to create the illusion of subtle textures.  His chosen subject matter has included the iconography of the American Civil War, the Confederate flag, Blues music, and rivers.  Twiggs' work deals with the role of relics, images, and icons in the culture of the South Eastern United States.

External links 
 Leo Twiggs and the Icons of Memory
 Leo Twiggs at the Hampton III Gallery
 Official Website

1934 births
Living people
20th-century American painters
American male painters
21st-century American painters
Artists from Charleston, South Carolina
University of Georgia alumni
South Carolina State University faculty
Claflin University alumni
New York University alumni
People from St. Stephen, South Carolina
Painters from South Carolina
20th-century American male artists
21st-century American male artists
20th-century African-American painters
21st-century African-American artists